Jan Dombrowski (26 May 1926 – 24 February 1992) was a Polish bobsledder. He competed in the four-man event at the 1956 Winter Olympics.

References

1926 births
1992 deaths
Polish male bobsledders
Olympic bobsledders of Poland
Bobsledders at the 1956 Winter Olympics
People from Przemyśl